Alyaksandr Ivanavich Karnitsky (born 14 February 1989) is a Belarusian professional footballer who plays for Hungarian side Mezőkövesd. His positions are central midfielder and defensive midfielder.

Club career
He came off the bench as FC Tosno won the 2017–18 Russian Cup final against FC Avangard Kursk on 9 May 2018 in the Volgograd Arena.

Career statistics

Notes

Personal life
His younger brother Valery Karnitsky is also a professional footballer, who is currently playing for Smolevichi-STI.

Honours
BATE Borisov
Belarusian Premier League champion: 2014, 2015, 2016
Belarusian Cup winner: 2014–15
Belarusian Super Cup winner: 2014, 2015, 2016

Tosno
 Russian Cup: 2017–18

References

External links
 
 Profile at Gomel website
 Profile at BATE website

1989 births
Living people
People from Stowbtsy
Belarusian footballers
Association football midfielders
Belarus international footballers
Belarusian expatriate footballers
Expatriate footballers in Israel
Expatriate footballers in Russia
Expatriate footballers in Romania
Expatriate footballers in Hungary
Belarusian expatriate sportspeople in Israel
Belarusian expatriate sportspeople in Hungary
Israeli Premier League players
Russian Premier League players
Nemzeti Bajnokság I players
FC Baranovichi players
FC Polotsk players
FC Granit Mikashevichi players
FC Gomel players
FC BATE Borisov players
Hapoel Ra'anana A.F.C. players
FC Tosno players
Sepsi OSK Sfântu Gheorghe players
Mezőkövesdi SE footballers
Sportspeople from Minsk Region